The politics of the Lao People's Democratic Republic (commonly known as Laos) takes place in the framework of a one-party parliamentary socialist republic. The only legal political party is the Lao People's Revolutionary Party (LPRP). The head of state is President Thongloun Sisoulith, who is also the LPRP general secretary, making him the supreme leader of Laos. The head of government is Prime Minister Phankham Viphavanh.

Government policies are determined by the party through the all-powerful nine-member LPRP Politburo and the 49-member LPRP Central Committee. Important government decisions are vetted by the Council of Ministers.

Political culture 
Laos' first, French-written and monarchical constitution was promulgated on May 11, 1947 and declared it to be an independent state within the French Union. The revised constitution of May 11, 1957, omitted reference to the French Union, though close educational, health and technical ties with the former colonial power persisted. The 1957 document was abrogated on December 3, 1975, when a communist state was proclaimed.

A new constitution was adopted in 1991 and enshrined a "leading role" for the LPRP. The following year, elections were held for a new 85-seat National Assembly with members elected by secret ballot to five-year terms. This National Assembly approves all new laws, although the executive branch retains authority to issue binding decrees.

The most recent election took place in February 2021. The election was tightly-controlled by the ruling  LPRP.

Insurgency 

In the early 2000s, bomb attacks against the government occurred, coupled with small exchanges of fire, across Laos. A variety of different groups have claimed responsibility including the Committee for Independence and Democracy in Laos and Lao Citizens Movement for Democracy.

Lao People's Revolutionary Party

Politburo

 Lt. Gen. Choummaly Sayasone, General Secretary of the Lao People's Revolutionary Party
 Thongsing Thammavong, Prime Minister (since 23 December 2010)
 Colonel Bounnhang Vorachith, Vice President of Lao People's Democratic Republic, Standing Member of the Secretariat
 Pany Yathotou, Chairwoman of the National Assembly (since 23 December 2010)
 Dr Thongloun Sisoulith, Deputy Prime Minister, Minister of Foreign Affairs, Head of the Party's National External Relations Committee
 Maj. Gen. Asang Laoly, Deputy Prime Minister
 Lt. Gen. Douangchay Phichith, Deputy Prime Minister, Minister of National Defence (died in 2014)
 Somsavat Lengsavad, Deputy Prime Minister
 Dr. Bounthong Chitmany, Chairman of the Party Central Committee's Commission for Inspection, Chairman of the State Inspection Committee.
 Dr Bounpone Bouttanavong, Deputy Prime Minister
 Dr. Phankham Viphavanh, Deputy Prime Minister, Minister of Education and Sports

Secretariat

 Lt. Gen. Choummaly Sayasone
 Bounnhang Vorachit (PCC Standing Secretariat)
 Dr Bounthong Chitmany, Chairman of the Commission for Inspection, Chairman of the State Inspection Committee
 Dr Bounpone Bouttanavong, Head of Lao Party Central Office, Deputy Prime Minister
 Dr Thongban Seng-aphone, Minister of Public Security (died in 2014)
 Chansy Phosikham, Head of the Party's Central Organisation Commission
 Soukan Mahalath, Secretary of the Vientiane City Party Committee, Vientiane Mayor (died in 2014)
 Lt. Gen. Sengnuan Xayalath, Acting Minister of National Defense (June 2014)
 Cheuang Sombounkhanh, Head of the Central Propaganda and Training Commission (died in 2014)

Inspection Committee of the Party Central Committee
 Bounthong Chitmany (President)
 Thongsy Ouanlasy
 Sinay Mienglavanh
 Khamsuan Chanthavong
 Thongsouk Bounyavong
 Singphet Bounsavatthiphan
 Bounpone Sangsomsak

Party Central Committee Advisor: Khamtai Siphandon

Executive branch

|President
|Thongloun Sisoulith
|Lao People's Revolutionary Party
|22 March 2021
|-
|Prime Minister
|Phankham Viphavanh
|Lao People's Revolutionary Party
|22 March 2021
|}
The president is elected by the National Assembly for a five-year term. The prime minister and the Council of Ministers are appointed by the president with the approval of the National Assembly for a five-year term.

There are also four deputy prime ministers. As of a cabinet reshuffle on June 8, 2006, they are Maj. Gen. Douangchay Phichit (also defense minister), Thongloun Sisoulith (also foreign minister), Somsavat Lengsavad and Maj. Gen. Asang Laoly.

The 28-member cabinet also includes Onechanh Thammavong as labour minister, Chaleuan Yapaoher as justice minister, Nam Vignaket as industry and commerce minister, Sitaheng Latsaphone as agriculture minister and Sommad Pholsena as transport minister.

Legislative branch
The National Assembly (Sapha Heng Xat) has 164 members (158 are LPRP, 6 independents), elected for a five-year term.

Political parties and elections

Parliamentary elections

|General Secretary
|Thongloun Sisoulith
|Lao People's Revolutionary Party
|15 January 2021
|}

Judicial branch

Supreme People's Court 
According to Article 91 of the Constitution of the Lao PDR, the People's Court of the Lao People's Democratic Republic "consists of the Supreme People's Court, the local people's court and the military court as defined by law".

The Supreme People's Court of the Lao People's Democratic Republic was established in 1982. As outlined in Article 92, the People's Supreme Court of the Lao People's Democratic Republic is the highest judicial body and "examines the judgments and judgments of the people's courts and military courts". There has been indications that women have served on the provincial courts. For instance, in 2018, it was announced that Napaporn Phong Thai was appointed as the President of Court Zone 2, Xayaburi Province.

Per Article 93, the President, Vice President and the judges are appointed, transferred or removed by the Standing Committee of the National Assembly. Although the Standing Committee has decisive authority, the same article does state that President does have some power regarding the appointment, transferal or removal of the Vice President.

In 1983, Oun Nue Phimmasone became the first President of the People's Supreme Court. Currently, the President is Khamphanh Sithidampha.

Public Prosecutor's Office 
The Public Prosecutor's Office was established in 1990. Article 99 of the Constitution of Laos states that the office has the responsibility of "monitor[ing] the observance and implementation of laws throughout the country, protect[ing] the rights of the state and society...[and] the legitimate interests of the people, and prosecut[ing] detainees in accordance with the law". The office is organized in the following three ways:

Supreme People's Prosecutor

 The Office of the Supreme People's Prosecutor
 The Office of the Public Prosecutor at the appellate level

The Chief of the Supreme Public Prosecutor directs all the activities of the Public Prosecutor at every level. All activities are reported to the National Assembly.

Local People's Procuratorate

 Provincial and city public prosecutors' offices
 District, Municipal Public Prosecutor's Office (district or municipal public prosecutors are called local public prosecutors)

Military Prosecutor's Office

Currently, the Supreme People's Prosecutor is Khamsane Souvong.

Laos Bar Association 
As for attorneys in general, according to a 2016 article, there are 188 lawyers in Laos who are members of the Laos Bar Association. However, most of the attorneys have entered the government sector and do not practice law—seldom giving thought to practicing in the private sector. While there is evidence of female lawyers in Laos, there is no indication as to how women have fared in the legal field. Pursuant to the Resolution of the National Assembly No. 024 / NA (On the Adoption of the Law on Lawyers; November 9, 2016), requirements include possessing a baccalaureate degree, being a Laos citizen and passing an examination (separate requirements exist for foreign lawyers). Although the Laos Bar Association issues certificates to graduates of the legal profession, it is the Ministry of Justice of Laos that sets the legal training standards.

Government
 Agriculture and Forestry	Lien Thikeo
 Education and Sports 	Sengdeuan Lachanthaboun
 Energy and Mines	Khammany Inthilath
 Finance	Bounchom Oubonpaseuth
 Foreign Affairs	Saleumxay Kommasith
 Home Affairs (Interior)	Khammanh Sounvileuth
 Industry and Commerce	Khemmani Pholsena

 Information, Culture and Tourism	Bosengkham Vongdara
 Justice	Saysi Santhivong
 Labour and Social Welfare	Khampheng Saysompheng
 Minister of Post, Telecom and Communications	Thansamay Kommasith
 National Defense	Chansamone Chanyalath
 Natural Resources and Environment	Sommath Pholsena
 Planning and Investment	Souphanh Keomixay
 Ministry of Health	Bounkong Syhavong
 Public Security	Brigadier General Somkeo Silavong
 Public Works and Transport	Bounchanh Sinthavong

Presidential Palace Office 
 Phongsavath Boupha, Minister to Presidential Palace's Office

PM Office 
 Sonxay Siphandone, Minister to the Prime Minister's Office, Head of the government Secretariat committee
 Bounpheng Mounphosay, Minister to Prime Minister's Office, Head the Public Administration and Civil Service Authority (PACSA)
 Bounheuang Douangphachanh, Minister to the Prime Minister's office, Chairman of the National Steering Committee for Rural Development and Poverty Reduction
 Dr Douangsavath Souphanouvong, Minister to Prime Minister's Office
 Dr Bounteim Phitsamai, Minister to Prime Minister's Office
 Khempheng Pholsena, Minister to Prime Minister's Office
 Phupeth Khamphounvong, Minister to the Prime Minister's Office
Somphao Phaysith, Governor of Lao PDR Central Bank

National Assembly (April 2016) 
 President of the National Assembly: Pany Yathotou (re-elected)
 Vice-President of the National Assembly: Somphanh Phengkhammy (re-elected), Sengnouan Sayalath, Bounpone Bouttanavong and Sisay Leudethmounsone

Administrative divisions 

Laos is divided into 17 provinces (khoueng, singular and plural), 1 municipality* ( nakhon luang vientiane, singular and plural):
Attapu, Bokeo, Borikhamxay, Champassack, Houaphan, Khammouane, Louang Namtha, Luangphabang, Oudomxay, Phongsaly, Saravane, Savannakhet, Sekong, Vientiane*, Vientiane, Sayaboury, Xaisomboun, and Xieng Khouang.

References